Cobb Peak is a  mountain summit located in Tooele County, Utah, United States.

Description
Cobb Peak is the fourth-highest summit in the Silver Island Mountains which are a subset of the Great Basin Ranges. It is set on land administered by the Bureau of Land Management. The Bonneville Speedway is 12 miles to the southwest and line parent Graham Peak is three miles to the west. This landform's toponym was officially adopted in 1960 by the U.S. Board on Geographic Names to honor John Cobb (1899–1952), an English racing driver who set three land speed records at the Bonneville Salt Flats, including a record 394 MPH on September 16, 1947.

Climate
Cobb Peak is set in the Great Salt Lake Desert which has hot summers and cold winters. The desert is an example of a cold desert climate as the desert's elevation makes temperatures cooler than lower elevation deserts. Due to the high elevation and aridity, temperatures drop sharply after sunset. Summer nights are comfortably cool. Winter highs are generally above freezing, and winter nights are bitterly cold, with temperatures often dropping well below freezing.

Gallery

See also
 
 List of mountain peaks of Utah

References

External links
 Cobb Peak: weather forecast

Mountains of Utah
Mountains of Tooele County, Utah
North American 2000 m summits
Great Salt Lake Desert
Mountains of the Great Basin